Men's Greco-Roman 80 kg competition at the 2015 European Games in Baku, Azerbaijan, took place on 13 June at the Heydar Aliyev Arena.

Schedule
All times are Azerbaijan Summer Time (UTC+05:00)

Results

Final

Top half

Bottom half

Repechage

References

External links

Wrestling at the 2015 European Games